Punyelroo is a town located on the Murray River in South Australia, Australia, approximately 5 kilometres downstream from Swan Reach, but on the opposite (western or Adelaide City) side of riverbank. The town is named after a local homestead. It accessible by sealed bitumen road most conveniently off the Sedan Swan Reach Road or by well made dirt road from Mannum.

Punyelroo is known for the Punyelroo Cave, located on the banks of the Murray River. The cave is approximately 3 kilometres in length, and is the longest of the several caves located in the Murray Plains area. In a 2021 Caves Australia article, Karl Brandt proposed Punyelroo Cave as the historical lair of the Whowie, a fearsome creature from Australian Aboriginal mythology.

Punyelroo is a town with water front properties and shacks. There is also a caravan/camping park with a boat ramp made up predominantly of owner occupied shack owners and on-site managers residence.

Notes and references

Towns in South Australia
Populated places on the Murray River